The Hazel's forest frog (Platymantis hazelae) is a species of frog in the family Ceratobatrachidae.
It is endemic to the Philippines, where it occurs on the mountains of Negros and possibly also Masbate.

Its natural habitats are subtropical or tropical moist lowland forest and subtropical or tropical moist montane forest.
It is threatened by habitat loss.

References

Platymantis
Amphibians of the Philippines
Taxonomy articles created by Polbot
Amphibians described in 1920